Leucopogon juniperinus, commonly known as prickly beard-heath, is a species of flowering plant in the heath family Ericaceae and is endemic to south-eastern continental Australia. It is an erect, densely-branched shrub with oblong to more or less egg-shaped leaves with the narrower end towards the base, and white, tube-shaped flowers arranged singly in upper leaf axils.

Description

Taxonomy
Leucopogon juniperinus was first formally described in 1810 by Robert Brown in his Prodromus Florae Novae Hollandiae et Insulae Van Diemen. The specific epithet (juniperinus) means "juniper-like".

Distribution and habitat
Prickly beard-heath grows in forest and open shrubland on the coast and nearby tablelands of south-eastern Queensland, New South Wales and east of the Mitchell River in Victoria.

References

juniperinus
Ericales of Australia
Flora of New South Wales
Flora of Queensland
Flora of Victoria (Australia)
Plants described in 1810
Taxa named by Robert Brown (botanist, born 1773)